Events in the year 2017 in Belgium.

Incumbents
Monarch: Philippe
Prime Minister: Charles Michel

Events
January
 17 January – Public outcry about Romanie Schotte, crowned Miss Belgium 3 days before, posting a Pile of Poo emoji in response to a racist comment about somebody in the background of one of her Instagram photos, many taking it to indicate agreement with the comment.

February
 14 February – Mayor of Mechelen, Bart Somers, wins world mayor of the year award, for his efforts to promote integration and prevent crime.

May
 24 May – Thousands demonstrate in Brussels to protest Donald Trump's presence for a NATO summit.
 25 May – Donald Trump addresses NATO summit in Brussels.

June 
 20 June – June 2017 Brussels attack: after an explosion without casualties in Brussels Central Station, a suspect is shot dead by patrolling soldiers.

August 
 25 August – August 2017 Brussels attack: two soldiers injured in a knife attack; Islamic State claims responsibility.

October
 30 October – Carles Puigdemont and others facing rebellion charges for their role in the Catalan declaration of independence take refuge in Belgium.

November
 11 November – Rioting and looting in Brussels after celebrations of the Morocco national football team qualifying for the 2018 FIFA World Cup turn violent; 23 injured, including 22 police officers.

Sports
July
 2 July – Stage 2 of the 104th Tour de France ends in Liège, with Marcel Kittel as winner.
 3 July – Stage 3 of the 104th Tour de France starts in Verviers.

Deaths

5 January – Luc Coene, economist (b. 1947).
11 January – François Van der Elst, footballer (b. 1954).
21 January – Marc Baecke, footballer (b. 1956).
 1 February
Étienne Tshisekedi, Congolese politician (b. 1932).
Antoon Verschoot, bugler (b. 1925).
 8 February – Jan Vansina, historian and anthropologist (b. 1929).
 9 February – Serge Baguet, cyclist (b. 1969).
 20 February – André Vlayen, cyclist (b. 1931).
 27 February – Marcel De Corte, footballer (b. 1929).
 2 March – Édouard Close, politician (b. 1929).
 6 March – Eddy Pauwels, cyclist (b. 1935).
 12 March – Patrick Nève, racing driver (b. 1949).
 17 April – Nicolle Van Den Broeck, cyclist (b. 1946).
 30 April – Jean De Mesmaeker (Jidéhem), cartoonist (b. 1935).
 15 May – Ulrich Libbrecht, philosopher (b. 1928).
 20 May – Emile Degelin, filmmaker (b. 1926).
 24 May – Pierre Seron, cartoonist (b. 1942).
 1 June – Leon Lemmens, bishop (b. 1954).
 6 June – François Houtart, radical priest (b. 1925).
 1 September – Annette Wademant, screenwriter (b. 1928)
 7 December – Philippe Maystadt, politician (b. 1948).

References

 
Belgium
Belgium
2010s in Belgium
Years of the 21st century in Belgium